Lawson is a small unincorporated community situated along Clear Creek in Clear Creek County, Colorado, United States.  Lawson is a part of the Downieville-Lawson-Dumont census-designated place.

History
A post office called Lawson was established in 1877, and remained in operation until 1966. The community was named for Alexander Lawson, the proprietor of a local inn.

Geography
Lawson is located at  (39.76395,-105.623674).

See also
 Denver-Aurora Metropolitan Statistical Area
 Denver-Aurora-Boulder Combined Statistical Area
 Front Range Urban Corridor
 List of cities and towns in Colorado

References

Unincorporated communities in Clear Creek County, Colorado
Unincorporated communities in Colorado
Denver metropolitan area